The Political Economy of Human Rights is a 1979 two-volume work by Noam Chomsky and Edward S. Herman. The authors offer a critique of United States foreign policy, particularly in Indochina.

Summary 
Chomsky and Herman discuss United States foreign policy in Indochina, with significant focus on the Vietnam War. They include sections on the My Lai Massacre, Operation Speedy Express and the Phoenix Program.

The authors challenge received wisdom on foreign policy, presenting a stark critique of the international human rights record of the United States and an indictment of the American media and of academic scholarship, alleging their complicity in this record. The two volumes are:
The Political Economy of Human Rights, Volume I: The Washington Connection and Third World Fascism (1979). . .
The Political Economy of Human Rights, Volume II: After the Cataclysm: Postwar Indochina and the Reconstruction of Imperial Ideology (1979). . .

The first volume is a greatly expanded version of Chomsky and Herman's Counter-Revolutionary Violence: Bloodbaths in Fact & Propaganda. It repeats the themes of "bloodbath" and "terror" classification and the categories and examples discussed include:
 Benign – East Pakistan in 1971, Burundi in 1972; Indians of Latin America, particularly the genocide of the Aché of Paraguay, 1970s; East Timor, 1975–1979;
 Constructive – Indonesia in 1965–1966; French in Vietnam, 1950s; Diem regime in Vietnam, 1950s; the United States in Vietnam, 1960s; the United States in the Philippines, periodically from 1898 to 1979, when The Political Economy of Human Rights was published; Dominican Republic, 1965 to the 1970s, Latin America, from the American overthrow of the Guatemalan government in 1954 to the 1970s;
 Nefarious – Vietnamese revolutionary, 1950s and 1960s;
 Mythical – North Vietnamese land reform in the 1950s; North Vietnamese in Huế in 1968.

Content  
In the study's frontispiece, countries that practice torture on an administrative basis during the 1970s are listed. Most of these countries are defined by the authors as being in the US ”sphere of influence”. These include the right wing dictatorships that at the time governed most of Latin America as well as a handful of dictatorships in the Middle East (including the shah's Iran which they quote the Secretary-General of Amnesty International as claiming to have the world's worst human rights record), Northern Africa, Southern Europe and Asia. The countries are said to be in the U.S. sphere of influence because they have been recipients of significant amounts of U.S. military aid and training.

The authors note that the study is not devoted to an analysis of the Soviet empire, although in summarizing their findings they do make some tangential remarks comparing the American and Soviet empires, the latter being defined by the authors as Eastern Europe. They quote Amnesty as finding that torture seems to have declined in Eastern Europe since the death of Stalin. From this they conclude that the growth of torture which has occurred since then, appears to be ”largely a Free World phenomenon”, i.e. occurring in the American sphere of influence.

In a critical review (see "Reception" below) Morris mentions Soviet backing for the Argentine dictatorship as an example of an alleged omission in the work he reviews. However, Chomsky and Herman do discuss that fact. They also feature references to Soviet (and American) support for human rights violations by Ethiopian governments. They present evidence of American support for the regime of Idi Amin.

In their chapter on Cambodia under Khmer Rouge rule, Chomsky and Herman firmly conclude that major atrocities have occurred. They review the available evidence, concluding that pieces of evidence that give the worst possible picture of the Khmer Rouge regime are given massive publicity in the U.S., while evidence giving a more positive picture—many of which they review, without endorsement—get systematically suppressed. One theme in the chapter is that, the very nature of the U.S. propaganda system is such that, analyses that present the Khmer Rouge in a favorable light, will be relegated to obscure sources.

The authors discuss, among many other documents, Murder in a Gentle Land by John Barron and Anthony Paul, a study extremely critical of the Khmer Rouge, which, they note was ”widely and generally quite favorably reviewed” and ”subject to extensive comment” served up to a ”mass audience”. They present a detailed review of the book, at the end of which they conclude that it ”will not withstand scrutiny. The historical comments are worthless and their effort to document what might have been observed reduces to the testimony of refugees, that is, unverifiable testimony.”

Reception 
Not being published by a major house, The Political Economy of Human Rights received hardly any reviews in mainstream American newspapers and popular journals.

One critical review was published in Harvard International Review, in 1981 by Stephen Morris, in which he accuses Chomsky and Herman of having an ingrained bias in the methodology they use to measure terror in the client-states of the United States, and the client-states of the Soviet Union. 

He writes:

See also 
 Counter-Revolutionary Violence: Bloodbaths in Fact & Propaganda 
 Manufacturing Consent: The Political Economy of the Mass Media

External links 
 The Political Economy of Human Rights (1979)

References 

1979 non-fiction books
Political books
American non-fiction books
Books by Edward S. Herman
Books by Noam Chomsky
Books about media bias
Books about propaganda
Books about politics of the United States
Books about foreign relations of the United States
Books about terrorism
English-language books
Vietnam War books
Collaborative non-fiction books